Sohawal is a town and tehsil  in Faizabad district (officially Ayodhya district) in the Indian state of Uttar Pradesh and is subpost office of Faizabad. Sohawal is 18 km west of district headquarters Ayodhya.

Demographics

 India census, Sohawal had a population of 25,123. Males constitute 51% of the population and females 49%. Sohawal has an average literacy rate of 62%, higher than the national average of 59.5%: male literacy is 71%, and female literacy is 52%. In Sohawal, 17% of the population is under 6 years of age.

Government and politics 
Sohawal is a block in the Faizabad district in Uttar Pradesh. 

The town is a part of Faizabad Lok Sabha constituency in Uttar Pradesh, India. Lallu Singh from Bharatiya Janata Party is the MP of Faizabad Lok Sabha constituency in Uttar Pradesh.

Transport

Road
Sohawal is well connected with nearby cities Faizabad and Ayodhya. And also with Rudauli, Goshainganj and Bikapur towns of Faizabad district.

Railway
Sohawal railway station serves the town of Sohawal.

Air
Ayodhya Airport is the nearest airport.

References

 Cities and towns in Faizabad district